Nestor Almanza (born 29 March 1971) is a Cuban wrestler. He competed in the men's Greco-Roman 74 kg at the 1992 Summer Olympics.

References

External links
 

1971 births
Living people
Cuban male sport wrestlers
Olympic wrestlers of Cuba
Wrestlers at the 1992 Summer Olympics
Place of birth missing (living people)
20th-century Cuban people